Emozioni is the debut studio album by Dutch artist Marco Borsato. It was released on 3 March 1990 through Polydor Records.

Track listing

Charts

References

1990 debut albums
Marco Borsato albums
Polydor Records albums